V-erbA-related protein 2 (EAR-2) also known as NR2F6 (nuclear receptor subfamily 2 group F member 6) is a protein that in humans is encoded by the NR2F6 gene. V-erbA-related protein 2 is a member of the nuclear receptor family of intracellular transcription factors. It is named after its similarity to v-erbA, a helper of an oncoprotein called v-erbB in avian erythroblastosis virus.

Function 

Comparatively little is known about ear-2, but it has been shown to function as a coregulator of other nuclear receptors.

Nr2f6 knockout mice show defects in development of the locus ceruleus.

It was found that antigen receptor stimulation-induced NF-AT/AP-1 activity is regulated through the nuclear receptor NR2F6 (NR2F6 acts as a direct repressor of NF-AT/AP-1 transactivation) and that by preventing NR2F6 function, transcriptional activation of NF-AT/AP-1 is enhanced in immune cells which leads to an augmented immune response.

NR2F6 impairs the formation of mature red blood cells in animals that over-express NR2F6 in their bone marrow. Mice that over expression of NR2F6 in their bone marrow cells have a block at the pro-erythroblast stage of blood cell development both in the bone marrow and in the spleen of animals that have excessive expression of NR2F6. So, when inhibition of differentiation of stem cell is desired, inhibition of differentiation is achieved through induction of increased NR2F6 activity. In situations where differentiation of stem cells into a cell of increased maturity is desired, inhibition of NR2F6 activity must be performed.

Clinical significance
It was found that expression of NR2F6 was consistently upregulated in neoplastic tissues in leukemic, ovarian cancer and endometrial cancer as compared to non-malignant tissues, while the silencing of NR2F6 induces a reduction of cancer cell proliferation, inhibiting clonogenicity and self-renewal of proliferating cancer cells, and induces differentiation.

Interactions 

V-erbA-related gene has been shown to interact with:
  COUP-TFII
 Thyroid hormone receptor beta

References

Further reading

External links 
 

Intracellular receptors
Transcription factors